Rockmount is a rural locality in the Lockyer Valley Region, Queensland, Australia.

Geography
Deverton is a neighbourhood in the south-east of the locality.

Rockmount has the following mountains:

 Mount Campbell 
 Mount Ridgley

History 
Rockmount Provisional School opened on 31 January 1899 but closed in early 1902. On 1 February 1904 the school reopened and on 1 January 1909 became Rockmount State School. It closed in 1920, but reopened on 26 November 1928. It closed finally on 24 January 1965. It was at 122 Rockmount Road.

Education 
There are no schools in Rockmount. The nearest government primary schools are:

 Flagstone Creek State School in Flagstone Creek to the north-east
 Mount Whitestone State School in Mount Whitestone to the east
 Ramsay State School in neighbouring Ramsay to the south-west
 Middle Ridge State School in Middle Ridge, Toowoomba, to the north-west

The nearest government secondary school is Centenary Heights State High School in Centenary Heights, Toowoomba.

References

Further reading 

 —  incorporating Rockmount State School (1899-1964), Mt. Campbell State School (1891-1960) Carpendale State School (1924- )

Lockyer Valley Region
Localities in Queensland